

A side-stick or sidestick controller is an aircraft control stick that is located on the side console of the pilot, usually on the righthand side, or outboard on a two-seat flightdeck. Typically this is found in aircraft that are equipped with fly-by-wire control systems.

The throttle controls are typically located to the left of a single pilot or centrally on a two-seat flightdeck. Only one hand is required to operate it; two hand operation is neither possible nor necessary.

The side-stick is used in many modern military fighter aircraft, such as the F-16 Fighting Falcon, Mitsubishi F-2, Dassault Rafale, and F-22 Raptor, and also on civil aircraft, such as the Sukhoi Superjet 100, Airbus A320 and all subsequent Airbus aircraft, including the largest passenger jet in service, the Airbus A380.

It is also used in new helicopter models such as the Bell 525.

This arrangement contrasts with the more conventional design where the stick is located in the centre of the cockpit between the pilot's legs, called a "centre stick".

In the centre stick design, like traditional airplane yokes, both the pilot's and co-pilot's controls are mechanically connected together so each pilot has a sense of the control inputs of the other. In typical Airbus side-stick implementations, the sticks are independent, the so-called 'passive' side-stick. The plane's computer either aggregates multiple inputs or a pilot can press a "priority button" to lock out inputs from the other side-stick. However, if both side-sticks are moved in different directions at the same time (regardless of which pilot has priority), then both inputs are cancelled out and an aural "dual input" warning sounds. Examples of this occurring include the 2009 crash of Air France Flight 447 (an Airbus A330 flying from Rio de Janeiro to Paris), the 2010 crash of Afriqiyah Airways Flight 771 an Airbus A330 from flying Johannesburg to Tripoli and the 2014 crash of Indonesia AirAsia Flight 8501 (an Airbus A320 flying from Surabaya to Singapore). The "dual input" warning will not activate at very low levels if the EGPWS activates due to its lower priority compared to EGPWS.

Active Side-Sticks 
However a later, significant, development is the 'active' side-stick, which is in the new Gulfstream G500/G600 series business jet aircraft. In this system, movements in one side-stick produce the same actions in the other side-stick and therefore provides valuable feedback to the other pilot. This addresses the earlier criticisms of the 'passive' side-stick. The 'active' side-stick also provides tactile feedback to the pilot during manual flight. In fact the three largest avionics manufacturers, Honeywell, Rockwell Collins and Thales, believe it will become the standard for all new fly-by-wire aircraft. In 2015 Ratier-Figeac as a subsidiary of UTC Aerospace Systems, and supplier of ‘passive’ side-sticks to Airbus since the 1980s became the supplier of ‘active’ side-sticks for the Irkut MC-21. This is the first airliner to use them.

Such an 'active' side-stick can also be used to increase adherence to a safe flight envelope by applying a force feedback when the pilot makes a control input that would bring the aircraft closer to (or beyond) the borders of the safe flight envelope. This reduces the risk of pilots entering dangerous states of flights outside the operational borders while maintaining the pilots' final authority and increasing their situation awareness.

See also
Centre stick
Yoke (aeronautics)
Fly-by-wire

Accidents
Air France Flight 447
Afriqiyah Airways Flight 771
Armavia Flight 967
Indonesia AirAsia Flight 8501

References

External links
Formation stick from Popular Science 1945.

Design
Aircraft controls